Richard Clay Travis (born April 6, 1979) is an American writer, lawyer, radio host and television analyst. As a sports journalist, Travis founded OutKick. 

As a political commentator, he and Buck Sexton host The Clay Travis and Buck Sexton Show, a three-hour weekday conservative talk show which debuted on June 21, 2021 as the replacement of The Rush Limbaugh Show on many radio stations. Travis describes himself as a "radical moderate" and claims to have been a lifelong Democratic voter before the election of Donald Trump in 2016.

Early life
In 1997, Travis graduated from Martin Luther King Magnet at Pearl High School in Nashville. He graduated from George Washington University in Washington, D.C., followed by Vanderbilt University Law School in Nashville.

Career 

Travis originally worked as a lawyer in the U.S. Virgin Islands and Tennessee. He attracted media attention in late 2004 with his personal blog written while he was living in the U.S. Virgin Islands. A Tennessee Titans fan, Travis was unable to get NFL Sunday Ticket, the satellite TV package to watch NFL games in the islands, and went on a "pudding strike", eating only pudding every day for 50 days, with the goal of forcing DirecTV to carry the package in the Virgin Islands. The effort failed, but he blogged about the experience and received media attention.

Travis began writing online for CBS Sports in September 2005, which for the first year was not paid. In 2006, Travis gave up his law practice for good. Later, while writing for CBS, Travis began working on a book, Dixieland Delight, where he visited the football stadiums of the 12 then-current members of the Southeastern Conference. After leaving CBS, Travis became a writer and editor at Deadspin, and then a national columnist at FanHouse.

Outkick the Coverage 
After FanHouse was merged into Sporting News in 2011, Travis founded Outkickthecoverage.com. The website later became one of the most visited college football sites on the web. While there, he continued developing his reputation for occasionally "contrarian" opinions.

In 2008, Travis worked out at D1 Sports Training with NFL prospects preparing for the NFL Draft. He later wrote a ten-part serial about the experience which he entitled Rough Draft.

In 2010, The Nashville Scene named Travis "Best Sports Radio Host We Love To Hate" in the publication's "Best of Nashville" issue. He later became a co-host of a sports radio talk show, 3HL, on Nashville's 104.5 The Zone with Brent Dougherty and Blaine Bishop. He also hosted a national sports radio show on NBC Sports.

Fox Sports 
In 2014, Travis resigned from his role on 3HL and was hired by Fox Sports for its weekly college football Saturday pre-game show. In 2015, he signed a deal with Fox Sports to license his entire sports media brand under Fox Sports, including Outkick the Coverage, which was folded into Fox Sports' website. He also started a national weekly television show, started a daily Outkick the Show broadcast on Periscope and Facebook, and began a national radio show with Fox Sports Radio in 2016.

Travis was called out by DeMarcus Cousins for a 2010 prediction he had made that Cousins would be arrested within the next five years. In response, Travis offered to donate to a charity of Cousins' choosing.

Radio 
Travis began a daily sports radio show on Nashville’s 104.5 The Zone, 3HL, in 2010. After leaving 3HL, in 2016 he began the “Outkick the Coverage” radio show for Fox Sports Radio nationwide mornings from 6-9 am et. Travis left that show in May 2021, when it was announced Travis and Buck Sexton would be taking over Rush Limbaugh's time slot on Premiere Networks. That show debuted on June 21, 2021.

Political views 
A self-described "radical moderate" who is pro-choice and against the death penalty, Travis said he voted for former President Barack Obama twice and previously never voted Republican. In 2016, Travis voted for Gary Johnson of the Libertarian Party. As an undergrad, Travis interned for U.S. Representative Bob Clement for four years while in college at George Washington University. In 2000, he worked on Al Gore's presidential campaign. Travis was hired to work on U.S. Representative Jim Cooper's 2002 congressional campaign but was fired for wrecking Cooper's wife's car.

In August 2016, Travis criticized his alma mater, Vanderbilt University, for planning to remove the word "Confederate" from its historic Confederate Memorial Hall, comparing the move to actions taken by "Middle Eastern terrorists." Consequently, Travis lost a $3,000 promotion deal he had with Jack Daniel's. Travis said online that a Jack Daniel's representative decided that his Twitter commentary on the statue "brings (the company) into public disrepute."

On September 15, 2017, Travis appeared as a guest on CNN, with anchor Brooke Baldwin, to discuss free speech, specifically whether ESPN personality Jemele Hill should be fired for calling Donald Trump a "white supremacist" and stating that police officers are "modern-day slave catchers" on her personal Twitter page. Travis stated that it would be bad policy on ESPN's part to fire Hill for her private comments, just as it was bad policy when ESPN fired Curt Schilling for comments he made regarding transgender bathrooms on his personal Facebook page. Travis received criticism for using a phrase he commonly used on his radio show when he said "...I'm a First Amendment absolutist the only two things I 100 percent believe in are the First Amendment and boobs..." Baldwin cut the interview short and later responded, "when I first heard 'boobs' from a grown man on national television (in 2017!!!), my initial thought bubble was: 'Did I hear that correctly??..."

On September 20, 2017, Travis announced he was considering running as an Independent for U.S. Senator of Tennessee in the 2018 election if incumbent Bob Corker decided not to run. Travis also stated that he believed with his name recognition he "could beat anyone in the state" and would make both major parties "incredibly nervous." The following week, Senator Corker announced he would not be running for re-election, but Travis did not enter the race.

During the early months of the COVID-19 pandemic, Travis repeatedly downplayed the severity of the disease, calling it "overrated", claiming that it is less severe than the seasonal flu, projecting that fewer than several hundred would die of the disease in the US, that victims of the disease probably have been "killed a month or two earlier" than they would have been otherwise, and stated that the mortality rate for those under 80 and without pre-existing conditions is "virtually zero". He suggested that some advocates for mitigation measures to slow the spread were "rooting for the virus to triumph".

On October 30, 2020, Travis said that he would be voting for Donald Trump in the 2020 United States presidential election. He said it would be the first time he had ever voted for a Republican for president.

Personal life
Travis' wife, Lara, is a former Tennessee Titans cheerleader. They have three sons together.

Bibliography

Footnotes

References

External links 
 
 

 Out Kick
 

American sports journalists
American male journalists
American Internet company founders
American YouTubers
American podcasters
Living people
People from Nashville, Tennessee
Commentary YouTubers
News YouTubers
Sports YouTubers
Vanderbilt University Law School alumni
American sportswriters
Columbian College of Arts and Sciences alumni
Radical centrist writers
Fox Sports 1 people
YouTube channels launched in 2018
21st-century American journalists
1979 births
YouTube podcasters